Starr's Mill High School is a public high school located in Fayetteville, Georgia, United States. The school is governed by the Fayette County Board of Education.

The school also serves southern Peachtree City and parts of unincorporated Fayette County.

History

The Fayette County Board of Education commissioned Starr's Mill High School alongside Peeples Elementary School and Rising Starr Middle School in response to rapid population growth in southern Peachtree City. Before its permanent building was constructed, students attended the LaFayette Education Center in Fayetteville until the start of the 97-1998 school year. The school is named after a grist mill located a mile southeast of the campus.

School profile

Starr's Mill High School opened in 1997–1998 with 40 teachers and 650 students. As of 2020–21 its enrollment was 1,336 students, with 89.3  teachers.

5% of Starr's Mill minority students participate in the ESOL Program. Most SMHS students reside in Fayetteville and Peachtree City.

Starr's Mill was one of only three high schools in Georgia to be declared a School of Excellence in 2005, and it has been ranked as one of the best school public schools in America by Newsweek magazine.

Academics

The 2010 SAT average at Starr's Mill was 1632 (out of 2400).

Extra-curricular activities

Athletics
Baseball
Basketball
Cheerleading
Cross-country
Football
Golf
Lacrosse
Soccer
Softball
Swimming
Tennis
Track
Volleyball
Wrestling

Academics
Academic Team
Beta Club
Chorus
Debate Team
Eco Club
French Club
German Club
Health Occupations for Students of America
Literary Magazine
Math Team
Mock Trial Team
National History Bee and Bowl
Newspaper - The Prowler
Science Olympiad
Student Government Association
Yearbook
Ex Libris Book Club
Creative Writing Club
FCCLA
National Honor Society
Chess Club
Technology Student Association

<ref>

Notable alumni
 Paris Bennett (class of 2006) – American Idol contestant, 4th runner-up
 Casey Bond – actor (Moneyball), former MLB outfielder for the San Francisco Giants
 Jordan Davis – former member of Atlanta Silverbacks
 Reuben Houston (class of 2001) – cornerback for the Georgia Tech Yellow Jackets football team from 2002 to 2005
 Myles Jaye — MLB pitcher for the Detroit Tigers
 Ufomba Kamalu – Canadian football defensive tackle for the BC Lions
 Sam Martin – Appalachian State kicker, punter for the Buffalo Bills
 Kelley O'Hara (class of 2006) – US Women's National Team soccer player, appeared in 2011 FIFA Women's World Cup; gold medalist in 2012 Summer Olympics, 2015 FIFA Women's World Cup champion, 2019 FIFA Women's World Cup champion

References

External links
 Home page

Public high schools in Georgia (U.S. state)
Schools in Fayette County, Georgia
Educational institutions established in 1997
1997 establishments in Georgia (U.S. state)